Foundation Ice Stream is a major ice stream in Antarctica's Pensacola Mountains. The ice stream drains northward for  along the west side of the Patuxent Range and the Neptune Range to enter the Ronne Ice Shelf westward of Dufek Massif. The United States Geological Survey mapped the stream from surveys and U.S. Navy air photos, 1956–66. The Advisory Committee on Antarctic Names named the stream in recognition of the National Science Foundation, which provided major support to the U.S. Antarctic Research Program during this period.

See also
 List of glaciers in the Antarctic
 Glaciology

References 

Ice streams of Queen Elizabeth Land
Filchner-Ronne Ice Shelf